Lawson Huddleston (1677–1743) was an English priest. 

Huddleston was educated at Jesus College, Oxford. He held livings at St Nicholas, Kelston and St Cuthbert, Wells. He was Archdeacon of Bath from 1733 until his death on 19 April 1743.

References

Alumni of Jesus College, Oxford
Archdeacons of Bath
18th-century English Anglican priests
1677 births
1743 deaths